The 2012 Football Federation South Australia season was the 106th season of soccer in South Australia, and the seventh and final under the FFSA format.

2012 FFSA Super League

The 2012 FFSA Super League was the seventh and final edition of the FFSA Super League, the top level domestic association football competition in South Australia. 10 teams competed, all playing each other twice for a total of 18 rounds, with the top five at the end of the year qualifying for the McIntyre final five finals system to determine 1st to 5th place. The FFSA Super League became defunct at the end of the season, with the FFSA Premier League becoming the top level of domestic football in South Australia, consisting of all teams in the 2012 FFSA Super League, plus the top four teams from the 2012 FFSA Premier League.

League table

Finals

2012 FFSA Premier League

The 2012 FFSA Premier League was the seventh and final edition of the FFSA Premier League as the second level domestic association football competition in South Australia. 10 teams competed, all playing each other twice for a total of 18 rounds, with the top four at the end of the year being promoted to the 2013 National Premier Leagues South Australia, and the 5th through 10th placed teams were moved to the new FFSA State League.

League table

2012 FFSA State League

The 2012 FFSA State League was the seventh and final edition of the FFSA State League as the third level domestic association football competition in South Australia. 10 teams competed, all playing each other twice for a total of 18 rounds. At the end of the season N.A.B. SC disbanded, the other nine teams were all promoted to the second division of South Australian football and were joined by the bottom six teams from the FFSA Super League to form a new second tier competition, which had adopted the name "FFSA State League". The new competition was to be run parallel with the other second divisions of state level football around Australia.

League table

2012 Women's Premier League

The highest tier domestic football competition in South Australia for women was known for sponsorship reasons as the Adelaide Airport Women's Premier League. The 10 teams played a double round-robin for a total of 18 games.

See also
2012 FFSA Premier League
2012 FFSA Super League
2012 FFSA State League
National Premier Leagues South Australia
Football Federation South Australia

References

2012 in Australian soccer
Football South Australia seasons